John Fenwick (14 January 1602 to 2 July 1644) was a Member of Parliament from Northumberland, killed serving in the Royalist army during the First English Civil War.

Personal details
John Fenwick was the only son of Sir John Fenwick, 1st Baronet of Wallington Hall, Northumberland, and his first wife Katherine (1584-1616), sister to Sir Henry Slingsby, executed in 1658 for his part in a Royalist conspiracy.

He married Mary, daughter of Sir George Selby, of Whitehouse, County Durham.

Career
Fenwick matriculated from Trinity College, Cambridge at Easter 1628. He was admitted at Gray's Inn on 28 April 1630.

In November 1640, Fenwick was elected Member of Parliament for Morpeth, Northumberland in the Long Parliament. In early 1644, he raised a troop of dragoons for the Royalist Northern Army;  and was excluded from Parliament on 22 January 1644.

His troop was at the siege of Newcastle, and a skirmish near Corbridge in 1644. He was killed at the Battle of Marston Moor on 2 July 1644.

References

Sources
 

 
 

1644 deaths
English MPs 1640–1648
Cavaliers
People killed in the English Civil War
Military personnel from Northumberland
Alumni of Trinity College, Cambridge
Heirs apparent who never acceded
Royalist military personnel of the English Civil War
1602 births